Beard is an unincorporated community in Warren Township, Clinton County, Indiana.

History
Beard was founded around 1839.

Geography

Notable person
Elmer Johnson, baseball player

References

Unincorporated communities in Clinton County, Indiana
Unincorporated communities in Indiana